Moncalvo is a village and comune in the Province of Asti in the Italian region Piedmont, located about  east of Turin and about  northeast of Asti on the national road SS 547 which links Asti to Casale Monferrato and Vercelli. Historically it was part of the state of Montferrat and was of particular importance during the early years of the Paleologi period of the marquisate. Its best-known inhabitants were the Baroque painter Guglielmo Caccia and ‘La Bella Rosin’, King Victor Emmanuel II’s favourite mistress and eventually wife.

Moncalvo borders the following municipalities: Alfiano Natta, Castelletto Merli, Cereseto, Grana, Grazzano Badoglio, Ottiglio, Penango, and Ponzano Monferrato.

Main sights
Churches in the town include:
Sant'Antonio da Padova, 10th century parish church
San Francesco d’Assisi.  Built in 1272, rebuilt in 1644, now parish church
San Antonio Abate, built in 1623 
Madonna delle Grazie. Originally an oratory of the 16th century, rebuilt by Magnocavalli (1756-58).
San Marco - 15th century church adjacent to hospital
San Rocco, erected  im 1600
San Giovanni Battista - church erected 1960
Chiesa dell’ Annunciazione (dell’ Ospizio) - near Palazzo Cissello 
San Pietro in Vincoli, in strada Gessi, 18th century
Santa Croce a Patro  - church erected in 16th century   
Santa Caterina d’Alessandria in frazione Castellino  - Church erected first in 1584; presently a 19th century reconstruction
San Giorgio presso Castellino - chapel remains of parish church
Santa Maria delle Peschiere in frazione Santa Maria - Documented since 1573, rebuilt in 1624, and again 1754

References

Moncalvo